The Newcastle Croatia Football Club is an Australian football (soccer) from Newcastle, New South Wales. The club was formed by the city's Croatian Australian community as Newcastle Croatia in 1984 and debuted that year in the 5th Division of the Newcastle League. the club is based in Wickham, New South Wales and would in following years change its name to Wickham Croatia. The club eventually disbanded in 1994.

In 2021, under the umbrella of the Croatian Wickham Sports Club, the club was re-established and is set to play its first season since re-establishment in 2022 in the Northern NSW Zone Football League Three (6th division of Northern NSW).

History

First Iteration (1984-1994) 

• 1986, Minor Premiers of the 5th Division and were promoted to 4th Division

• 1987, Grand Finalists and Minor Premiers of 4th Division

• 1988, Grand Final Runners-Up and Minor Premiers of 3rd Division. Promoted to 2nd Division

It was a remarkably quick rise from the club, by 1991 the club had made it all the way to the premier competition, the NBN State Football League, only 7 years after its formation. The club immediately cemented itself as one of the top sides in the league, finishing an impressive 4th in its debut season.

The club had a few stellar seasons in the NBN State Football League where it came 3rd in seasons 1992 and 1993. In 1992 the club had a great run in the finals, with the club making the Grand Final against West Wallsend FC. Unfortunately Newcastle Croatia went down 2–1 at Austral Park in front of a crowd of 2,500 spectators. The club would again make the Grand Final in 1994, losing 2–1 to Highfields Azzurri.

However the club was disbanded following the 1994 season when it couldn't field a team in the NBN State Football League. The club had also been a regular participant in the Australian-Croatian Soccer Tournament.

The 1992 Newcastle Croatia Grand Final squad:
David Connor
Grant Brinkworth
John Tonkin
Craig A. Jones
Michael Boogaard
Reg Chilby (captain)
John Govan
Steve Bajzath
Karl Freeman
Steve Brown
Lorenzo Saetta

Substitutes:
Craig L. Jones
Doug Elphick
Chris Breasley
Jason Coombes
Michael Kmet

Richard Hartley (coach)

Second Iteration (2021-present) 
In 2021, under the umbrella of the Croatian Wickham Sports Club, the club was re-established and is set to play its first season since re-establishment in 2022 in the Northern NSW Zone Football League Three.

See also
List of Croatian football clubs in Australia
Australian-Croatian Soccer Tournament

References

Croatian sports clubs in Australia
Defunct soccer clubs in Australia
Soccer clubs in Newcastle, New South Wales
1984 establishments in Australia
1994 disestablishments in Australia
Association football clubs established in 1984
Association football clubs disestablished in 1994